The following is a list of churches in Plymouth.

The city has an estimated 113 churches for 264,200 people, a ratio of one church to every 2,338 people.

References 

Churches in Plymouth
Plymouth